The Ortega y Gasset Journalism Awards are named after the Spanish philosopher and journalist José Ortega y Gasset.  The awards were created by the newspaper El País in 1984.

Every year, these awards are given to those whose work has shown "a remarkable defense of freedom, independence, honesty and professional rigor as essential virtues of journalism". The awards were originally divided in four categories:
Periodismo impreso (printed journalism)
Periodismo digital (digital journalism)
Periodismo gráfico (graphic journalism)
Trayectoria profesional (career award)

As of 2016, the new categories are:

Mejor Historia e Investigación Periodística (Best Story or Journalistic Investigation)
Mejor Cobertura Multimedia (Best Multimedia Coverage)
Mejor Fotografía (Best photography)
Trayectoria profesional (Career Award)

Winners

 2000: 
Best Information Work: Ernesto Ekaizer
Best Opinion Article: Fernando Savater
Best Research Work: John Carlin
Graphic: Julio Villarino
 2001: 
Print: José Valdés and the research team of Reforma
Graphic: Gorka Lejarcegi
 Career award El Comercio, Lima.
 2002
 Best Information Work: El Nuevo Herald
 Best Research: Ángeles Espinosa – El País
 Graphic: Andrés Carrasco Ragel – Diario de Cádiz
 2003:
 Best Opinion Article: Roberto Pombo
Best Information Work: Spanish journalists who distinguished themselves in the war in Iraq (Special Award)
Graphic: Xurxo Lobato
 2004: 
Best Information Work: El Nuevo Día of Puerto Rico
Best Research Work: Bru Rovira
Graphic: Sergio Pérez Sanz
 2005: 
Best Information Work: Leticia Álvarez and Rosana Lanero – El Comercio
Best Research Work: Giannina Segnini, Ernesto Rivera and Mauricio Herrera Ulloa – La Nación
Graphic: Pablo Torres
 2006
Print: Matías Vallés, Felipe Armendáriz and Marisa Goñi, journalists of Diario de Mallorca
Digital: Sandra Balsells
Graphic: Sergio Caro
Career Award: Lozano family for La Opinión of Los Angeles
 2007
Print: Roberto Navia
Digital: Mundo.com en español (BBC website)
Graphic: Desirée Martín
Career award: Raúl Rivero
 2008
Print: Sanjuana Martínez
Digital: Yoani Sánchez
Graphic: Gervasio Sánchez
Career Award: Zeta Magazine
2009
Print: Jorge Martínez Reverte
Digital: Amaya García Ortiz de Jocano
Graphic: Adolfo Suárez Illana (for photo of his father Adolfo Suárez)
Career award: Tomás Eloy Martínez
 2010
Print: El País (investigative journalism on the Gurtel case)
Digital: Judith Torrea (for her blog, "Ciudad Juárez, en la sombra del narcotráfico")
Graphic: José Cendón
Career Award: Jean Daniel
2011
Print: Octavio Enriquez
Digital: Carlos Martínez D'Abuisson
Graphic: Cristóbal Manuel Sánchez Rodríguez
Career Award: Moisés Naím
 2012
 Print: Humberto Padgett
Digital: Carmela Ríos
Graphic: Carlos Jacobo Méndez
Career Award: Sir Harold Evans
2013
Print: Alberto Salcedo Ramos
Digital: Juan Ramón Robles
Graphic: Emilio Morenatti
Career Award: Jesús de la Serna
2014
Print: Pablo Ferri Tórtola, Alejandra Sánchez Inzunza and José Luis Pardo
Digital: Álvaro de Cózar, Mónica Ceberio, Cristina Pop, Luis Almodóvar, Álvaro de la Rúa, Paula Casado, Fernando Hernández, Ana Fernández, Rubén Gil, José María Ocaña, Gorka Lejarcegi, Gema García and Mariano Zafra
Graphic: Pedro Armestre
Career Award: Alan Rusbridger
2015
Print: Pedro Simón y Alberto Di Lolli
Digital: Gerardo Reyes
Graphic: José Palazón
Career Award: Teodoro Petkoff
2016
Best Story or Journalistic Investigation: Joseph Zárate Salazar (for his story "The woman of the blue lagoon against the black lagoon")
Best Multimedia Coverage: Lilia Saúl and Ginna Morelo (for their coverage "The disappeared")
Best Photography: Samuel Aranda
Career Award: Adam Michnik
2017
Best Story or Journalistic Investigation: El Periódico of Catalunya (for a series of stories on various cases of pedophilia in several schools in Barcelona)
Best Multimedia Coverage: Univisión Noticias (for their story "Holidays in no man's water")
Best Photography: Yander Alberto Zamora
Career Award: Alma Guillermoprieto
2018
Best Story or Journalistic Investigation:  Miriam Castillo, Nayeli Roldán and Manuel Ureste (for their investigation "The master scam")
Best Multimedia Coverage: Univisión, Inger Díaz Barriga (for her story "Better go, Cristina")
Best Photography: David Armengou and Marcela Miret
Career Award: Soledad Gallego-Díaz
2019
Best Story or Journalistic Investigation:  5W; Agus Morales and Eduardo Ponces (for their investigation "Los muertos que me habitan")
Best Multimedia Coverage: El Pitazo; Johanna Osorio Herrera y otros (for their investigation "La generación del hambre")
Best Photography: Vincent West of Reuters (for his image "el empuje y la fuerza")
Career Award: Darío Arizmendi

See also
 Prizes named after people

References

External links

Journalism awards
1984 establishments in Spain
Journalism in Spain
Awards established in 1984
José Ortega y Gasset